Georgia gained two seats after the 1810 Census.

Georgia elected its members October 5, 1812.

See also 
 Georgia's at-large congressional district special election, 1812
 Georgia's at-large congressional district special election, 1813
 United States House of Representatives elections, 1812 and 1813
 List of United States representatives from Georgia

1812
Georgia
United States House of Representatives